Nasonia longicornis is a species of pteromalid wasp in the family Pteromalidae. It can be identified by the structure of its antennae. It is a parasitoid of Protocalliphora pupae, usually found in birds' nests. The species is found in western North America. Females usually only mate once in their lifetime.

References

Pteromalidae
Articles created by Qbugbot
Insects described in 1990
Hymenoptera of North America